The 1973 Primera División season was the 82nd season of top-flight football in Argentina. Huracán won the Metropolitano (5th title) while Rosario Central won the Nacional (2nd title).

There were no relegations.

Metropolitano Championship

Nacional Championship

Group A

Group B

Final Tournament

References

Argentine Primera División seasons
Argentine Primera Division
Primera Division